Jaba may refer to:

Places
 Jaba Dimtu, Mandera County, Kenya
 Jaba, Nigeria
 Jaba', Haifa Subdistrict, a Palestinian Arab village depopulated in 1948
 Jaba', Jenin, a Palestinian village in the West Bank
 Jaba', Jerusalem, a Palestinian town in the West Bank
 Jab'a, Bethlehem Governorate, a Palestinian village in the central West Bank
 Jaba River, in Bougainville, Papua New Guinea

Other uses
 Jaba (given name), including a list of people with that name
 Jabá, (Silvino João de Carvalho, born 1981), Brazilian footballer
 Léo Jabá (born 1998), Brazilian footballer
 Journal of Applied Behavior Analysis (JABA), an academic journal
 Jaba language, or Hyam language
 Operation Jaba', or Operation Shoter, an Israeli operation during the 1948 Arab–Israeli War

See also
 
 Jabba (disambiguation)
 Jaber (disambiguation)
 Jbaa, a town in Lebanon
 Ya ba, a recreational drug